Kim Dong-Suk  (born 26 March 1987) is a South Korean football player who currently plays for Incheon United.

Club career
He joined in Anyang LG Cheetahs in 2003 when he was only 16. He made his professional debut in 2006, but he didn't become a first team regular until the 2007 season. Following a transfer to Ulsan Hyundai Horang-i in 2008, Kim struggled to establish himself as a first choice starter in the Ulsan squad, playing only 6 games that season.  He has been loaned to Daegu FC for the 2010 season.

International career
Kim Dong-Suk was a member of the 2007 FIFA U-20 World Cup squad, which failed to win a game at the tournament.

Club career statistics

References

External links

1987 births
Living people
Association football midfielders
South Korean footballers
FC Seoul players
Ulsan Hyundai FC players
Daegu FC players
K League 1 players
Footballers from Seoul